is a Japanese judoka. He competed in the men's 81 kg event at the 2012 Summer Olympics. He defeated Boas Munyonga in the second round and Sergiu Toma in the third round before losing to Ole Bischof in the fourth round; after defeating Leandro Guilheiro in the repechages, he lost to Ivan Nifontov in the bronze medal match.

References

External links
 
 

1990 births
Living people
Japanese male judoka
Olympic judoka of Japan
Judoka at the 2012 Summer Olympics
20th-century Japanese people
21st-century Japanese people